Alderley railway station is located on the Ferny Grove line in Queensland, Australia. It serves the Brisbane suburb of Alderley. It opened in 1899 at the same time as the line.

Services
Alderley station is served by all stops Ferny Grove line services from Ferny Grove to Roma Street, Park Road, Coopers Plains and Beenleigh.

Services by platform

References

External links

Alderley station Queensland Rail
Alderley station Queensland's Railways on the Internet
[ Alderley station] TransLink travel information

Railway stations in Brisbane
Railway stations in Australia opened in 1899